A boomerang is a thrown tool, typically constructed with aerofoil sections and designed to spin about an axis perpendicular to the direction of its flight. A returning boomerang is designed to return to the thrower, while a non-returning boomerang is designed as a weapon to be thrown straight and is traditionally used by some Aboriginal Australians for hunting.

Historically, boomerangs have been used for hunting, sport, and entertainment and are made in various shapes and sizes to suit different purposes. Although considered an Australian icon, ancient boomerangs have also been discovered in Africa, the Americas, and Eurasia.

Description 

A boomerang is a throwing stick with aerodynamic properties, traditionally made of wood, but also of bone, horn, tusks and even iron. Modern boomerangs used for sport may be made from plywood or plastics such as ABS, polypropylene, phenolic paper, or carbon fibre-reinforced plastics.

Boomerangs come in many shapes and sizes depending on their geographic or tribal origins and intended function. Many people think only of the traditional Australian type, although today there are many types of more easily usable boomerangs, such as the cross-stick, the pinwheel, the tumble-stick, the Boomabird, and many other less common types.

An important distinction should be made between returning boomerangs and non-returning boomerangs:
 Returning boomerangs fly, and are examples of the earliest heavier-than-air human-made flight. A returning boomerang has two or more aerofoil section wings arranged so that when spinning they create unbalanced aerodynamic forces that curve its path into an ellipse, returning to its point of origin when thrown correctly. Their typical L-shape makes them the most recognisable form of boomerang. Although used primarily for leisure or recreation, returning boomerangs are also used to decoy birds of prey, thrown above the long grass to frighten game birds into flight and into waiting nets. Non-traditional, modern, competition boomerangs come in many shapes, sizes and materials.
 Non-returning boomerangs, throwing sticks, valari, or kylies, are primarily used as weapons. They lack the aerofoil sections, are generally heavier and designed to travel as straight and forcefully as possible to the target to bring down game. The Tamil valari variant, of ancient origin and mentioned in the Tamil Sangam literature "Purananuru", was one of these.  The usual form of the Valari is two limbs set at an angle; one thin and tapering, the other rounded as a handle. Although valaris come in many shapes and sizes they are usually made of cast iron cast from moulds. However, some may have wooden limbs tipped with iron or with lethally sharpened edges or with special double-edged and razor-sharp daggers known as kattari.

Etymology 
The origin of the term is uncertain. One source asserts that the term entered the language in 1827, adapted from an extinct Aboriginal language of New South Wales, Australia, but mentions a variant, wo-mur-rang, which it dates to 1798. The first recorded encounter with a boomerang by Europeans was at Farm Cove (Port Jackson), in December 1804, when a weapon was witnessed during a tribal skirmish:

David Collins listed "Wo-mur-rāng" as one of eight Aboriginal "Names of clubs" in 1798. but was probably referring to the woomera, which is actually a spear-thrower. An anonymous 1790 manuscript on Aboriginal languages of New South Wales reported "Boo-mer-rit" as "the Scimiter".

In 1822, it was described in detail and recorded as a "bou-mar-rang" in the language of the Turuwal people (a sub-group of the Darug) of the Georges River near Port Jackson. The Turawal used other words for their hunting sticks but used "boomerang" to refer to a returning throw-stick.

History 

Boomerangs were, historically, used as hunting weapons, percussive musical instruments, battle clubs, fire-starters, decoys for hunting waterfowl, and as recreational play toys. Tribal boomerangs may be inscribed or painted with designs meaningful to their makers. Most boomerangs seen today are of the tourist or competition sort, and are almost invariably of the returning type.
Depictions of boomerangs being thrown at animals, such as kangaroos, appear in some of the oldest rock art in the world, the Indigenous Australian rock art of the Kimberly region, which is potentially up to 50,000 years old. Stencils and paintings of boomerangs also appear in the rock art of West Papua, including on Bird's Head Peninsula and Kaimana, likely dating to the Last Glacial Maximum, when lower sea levels led to cultural continuity between Papua and Arnhem Land in Northern Australia. The oldest surviving Australian Aboriginal boomerangs come from a cache found in a peat bog in the Wyrie Swamp of South Australia and date to 10,000 BC.

Although traditionally thought of as Australian, boomerangs have been found also in ancient Europe, Egypt, and North America. There is evidence of the use of non-returning boomerangs by the Native Americans of California and Arizona, and inhabitants of South India for killing birds and rabbits. Some boomerangs were not thrown at all, but were used in hand to hand combat by Indigenous Australians. Ancient Egyptian examples, however, have been recovered, and experiments have shown that they functioned as returning boomerangs. Hunting sticks discovered in Europe seem to have formed part of the Stone Age arsenal of weapons. One boomerang that was discovered in Obłazowa Cave in the Carpathian Mountains in Poland was made of mammoth's tusk and is believed, based on AMS dating of objects found with it, to be about 30,000 years old. In the Netherlands, boomerangs have been found in Vlaardingen and Velsen from the first century BC.
King Tutankhamun, the famous Pharaoh of ancient Egypt, who died over 3,300 years ago, owned a collection of boomerangs of both the straight flying (hunting) and returning variety.

No one knows for sure how the returning boomerang was invented, but some modern boomerang makers speculate that it developed from the flattened throwing stick, still used by the Australian Aborigines and other indigenous peoples around the world, including the Navajo in North America. A hunting boomerang is delicately balanced and much harder to make than a returning one. The curving flight characteristic of returning boomerangs was probably first noticed by early hunters trying to "tune" their throwing sticks to fly straight. The boomerangs were also widely used in the South of India in Tamilnadu. It is referred to as Valari. 

It is thought by some that the shape and elliptical flight path of the returning boomerang makes it useful for hunting birds and small animals, or that noise generated by the movement of the boomerang through the air, or, by a skilled thrower, lightly clipping leaves of a tree whose branches house birds, would help scare the birds towards the thrower. It is further supposed by some that this was used to frighten flocks or groups of birds into nets that were usually strung up between trees or thrown by hidden hunters. In southeastern Australia, it is claimed that boomerangs were made to hover over a flock of ducks; mistaking it for a hawk, the ducks would dive away, toward hunters armed with nets or clubs.

Traditionally, most boomerangs used by Aboriginal groups in Australia were non-returning. A throwstick thrown nearly horizontally may fly in a nearly straight path and could fell a kangaroo on impact to the legs or knees, while the long-necked emu could be killed by a blow to the neck. Hooked non-returning boomerangs, known as "beaked kylies", used in northern Central Australia, have been claimed to kill multiple birds when thrown into a dense flock. Throwsticks are used as multi-purpose tools by today's Aboriginal peoples, and besides throwing could be wielded as clubs, used for digging, used to start friction fires, and are sonorous when two are struck together.

Recent evidence also suggests that boomerangs were used as war weapons.

Modern use 

Today, boomerangs are mostly used for recreation. There are different types of throwing contests: accuracy of return; Aussie round; trick catch; maximum time aloft; fast catch; and endurance (see below). The modern sport boomerang (often referred to as a 'boom' or 'rang') is made of Finnish birch plywood, hardwood, plastic or composite materials and comes in many different shapes and colours.

Boomerangs have also been suggested as an alternative to clay pigeons in shotgun sports, where the flight of the boomerang better mimics the flight of a bird offering a more challenging target.

The modern boomerang is often computer-aided designed with precision airfoils. The number of "wings" is often more than 2 as more lift is provided by 3 or 4 wings than by 2. Among the latest inventions is a round-shaped boomerang, which has a different look but using the same returning principle as traditional boomerangs. This allows for safer catch for players.

In 1992, German astronaut Ulf Merbold performed an experiment aboard Spacelab that established that boomerangs function in zero gravity as they do on Earth. French Astronaut Jean-François Clervoy aboard Mir repeated this in 1997. In 2008, Japanese astronaut Takao Doi again repeated the experiment on board the International Space Station.

Beginning in the later part of the twentieth century, there has been a bloom in the independent creation of unusually designed art boomerangs. These often have little or no resemblance to the traditional historical ones and on first sight some of these objects may not look like boomerangs at all. The use of modern thin plywoods and synthetic plastics have greatly contributed to their success. Designs are very diverse and can range from animal inspired forms, humorous themes, complex calligraphic and symbolic shapes, to the purely abstract. Painted surfaces are similarly richly diverse. Some boomerangs made primarily as art objects do not have the required aerodynamic properties to return.

Aerodynamics 
A returning boomerang is a rotating wing. It consists of two or more arms, or wings, connected at an angle; each wing is shaped as an airfoil section. Although it is not a requirement that a boomerang be in its traditional shape, it is usually flat.

Boomerangs can be made for right- or left-handed throwers. The difference between right and left is subtle, the planform is the same but the leading edges of the aerofoil sections are reversed. A right-handed boomerang makes a counter-clockwise, circular flight to the left while a left-handed boomerang flies clockwise to the right.

A falling boomerang starts spinning, and most then fall in a spiral. When the boomerang is thrown with high spin, a boomerang flies in a curved rather than a straight line. When thrown correctly, a boomerang returns to its starting point.
As the wing rotates and the boomerang moves through the air, the airflow over the wings creates lift on both "wings". However, during one-half of each blade's rotation, it sees a higher airspeed, because the rotation tip speed and the forward speed add, and when it is in the other half of the rotation, the tip speed subtracts from the forward speed. Thus if thrown nearly upright, each blade generates more lift at the top than the bottom. While it might be expected that this would cause the boomerang to tilt around the axis of travel, because the boomerang has significant angular momentum, the gyroscopic precession causes the plane of rotation to tilt about an axis that is 90 degrees to the direction of flight, causing it to turn. When thrown in the horizontal plane, as with a Frisbee, instead of in the vertical, the same gyroscopic precession will cause the boomerang to fly violently, straight up into the air and then crash.

Fast Catch boomerangs usually have three or more symmetrical wings (seen from above), whereas a Long Distance boomerang is most often shaped similar to a question mark. Maximum Time Aloft boomerangs mostly have one wing considerably longer than the other. This feature, along with carefully executed bends and twists in the wings help to set up an "auto-rotation" effect to maximise the boomerang's hover time in descending from the highest point in its flight.

Some boomerangs have turbulators — bumps or pits on the top surface that act to increase the lift as boundary layer transition activators (to keep attached turbulent flow instead of laminar separation).

Throwing technique 
Boomerangs are generally thrown in unobstructed, open spaces at least twice as large as the range of the boomerang. The flight direction to the left or right depends upon the design of the boomerang itself, not the thrower. A right-handed or left-handed boomerang can be thrown with either hand, but throwing a boomerang with the non-matching hand requires a throwing motion that many throwers find awkward. The following technique applies to a right-handed boomerang; the directions are mirrored for a left-handed boomerang. Different boomerang designs have different flight characteristics and are suitable for different conditions. The accuracy of the throw depends on understanding the weight and aerodynamics of that particular boomerang, and the strength, consistency and direction of the wind; from this, the thrower chooses the angle of tilt, the angle against the wind, the elevation of the trajectory, the degree of spin and the strength of the throw. A great deal of trial and error is required to perfect the throw over time.

A properly thrown boomerang will travel out parallel to the ground, sometimes climbing gently, perform a graceful, anti-clockwise, circular or tear-drop shaped arc, flatten out and return in a hovering motion, coming in from the left or spiralling in from behind. Ideally, the hover will allow a practiced catcher to clamp their hands shut horizontally on the boomerang from above and below, sandwiching the centre between their hands.

The grip used depends on size and shape; smaller boomerangs are held between finger and thumb at one end, while larger, heavier or wider boomerangs need one or two fingers wrapped over the top edge in order to induce a spin. The aerofoil-shaped section must face the inside of the thrower, and the flatter side outwards. It is usually inclined outwards, from a nearly vertical position to 20° or 30°; the stronger the wind, the closer to vertical.  The elbow of the boomerang can point forwards or backwards, or it can be gripped for throwing; it just needs to start spinning on the required inclination, in the desired direction, with the right force.

The boomerang is aimed to the right of the oncoming wind; the exact angle depends on the strength of the wind and the boomerang itself. Left-handed boomerangs are thrown to the left of the wind and will fly a clockwise flight path. The trajectory is either parallel to the ground or slightly upwards. The boomerang can return without the aid of any wind, but even very slight winds must be taken into account however calm they might seem. If the wind is strong enough to fly a kite, then it may be too strong unless a skilled thrower is using a boomerang designed for stability in stronger winds. Gusty days are a great challenge, and the thrower must be keenly aware of the ebb and flow of the wind strength, finding appropriate lulls in the gusts to launch their boomerang.

Competitions and records 

A World Record achievement was made on 3 June 2007 by Tim Lendrum in Aussie Round. Lendrum scored 96 out of 100, giving him a National Record as well as an equal World Record throwing an "AYR" made by expert boomerang maker Adam Carroll.

In international competition, a world cup is held every second year. , teams from Germany and the United States dominated international competition. The individual World Champion title was won in 2000, 2002, 2004, 2012, and 2016 by Swiss thrower Manuel Schütz. In 1992, 1998, 2006, and 2008 Fridolin Frost from Germany won the title.

The team competitions of 2012 and 2014 were won by Boomergang (an international team). World champions were Germany in 2012 and Japan in 2014 for the first time. Boomergang was formed by individuals from several countries, including the Colombian Alejandro Palacio. In 2016 USA became team world champion.

Competition disciplines 

Modern boomerang tournaments usually involve some or all of the events listed below In all disciplines the boomerang must travel at least  from the thrower. Throwing takes place individually. The thrower stands at the centre of concentric rings marked on an open field.

Events include:

 Aussie Round: considered by many to be the ultimate test of boomeranging skills. The boomerang should ideally cross the  circle and come right back to the centre. Each thrower has five attempts. Points are awarded for distance, accuracy and the catch.
 Accuracy: points are awarded according to how close the boomerang lands to the centre of the rings. The thrower must not touch the boomerang after it has been thrown. Each thrower has five attempts. In major competitions there are two accuracy disciplines: Accuracy 100 and Accuracy 50.
 Endurance: points are awarded for the number of catches achieved in 5 minutes.
 Fast Catch: the time taken to throw and catch the boomerang five times. The winner has the fastest timed catches.
 Trick Catch/Doubling: points are awarded for trick catches behind the back, between the feet, and so on. In Doubling, the thrower has to throw two boomerangs at the same time and catch them in sequence in a special way.
 Consecutive Catch: points are awarded for the number of catches achieved before the boomerang is dropped. The event is not timed.
 MTA 100 (Maximal Time Aloft): points are awarded for the length of time spent by the boomerang in the air. The field is normally a circle measuring 100 m. An alternative to this discipline, without the 100 m restriction is called MTA unlimited.
 Long Distance: the boomerang is thrown from the middle point of a  baseline. The furthest distance travelled by the boomerang away from the baseline is measured. On returning, the boomerang must cross the baseline again but does not have to be caught. A special section is dedicated to LD below.
 Juggling: as with Consecutive Catch, only with two boomerangs. At any given time one boomerang must be in the air.

World records

Guinness World Record – Smallest Returning Boomerang 

This tiny boomerang flew the required , before returning to the accuracy circles on 22 March 1997 at the Australian National Championships.

Guinness World Record – Longest Throw of Any Object by a Human 

This broke the record set by Erin Hemmings who threw an Aerobie  on 14 July 2003 at Fort Funston, San Francisco.

Long-distance versions 

Long-distance boomerang throwers aim to have the boomerang go the furthest possible distance while returning close to the throwing point. In competition the boomerang must intersect an imaginary surface defined as an infinite vertical projection of a  line centred on the thrower. Outside of competitions, the definition is not so strict, and throwers may be happy simply not to walk too far to recover the boomerang.

General properties 
Long-distance boomerangs are optimised to have minimal drag while still having enough lift to fly and return. For this reason, they have a very narrow throwing window, which discourages many beginners from continuing with this discipline. For the same reason, the quality of manufactured long-distance boomerangs is often difficult to determine.

Today's long-distance boomerangs have almost all an S or ? – question mark shape and have a beveled edge on both sides (the bevel on the bottom side is sometimes called an undercut). This is to minimise drag and lower the lift. Lift must be low because the boomerang is thrown with an almost total layover (flat). Long-distance boomerangs are most frequently made of composite material, mainly fibre glass epoxy composites.

Flight path 
The projection of the flight path of long-distance boomerang on the ground resembles a water drop. For older types of long-distance boomerangs (all types of so-called big hooks), the first and last third of the flight path are very low, while the middle third is a fast climb followed by a fast descent. Nowadays, boomerangs are made in a way that their whole flight path is almost planar with a constant climb during the first half of the trajectory and then a rather constant descent during the second half.

From theoretical point of view, distance boomerangs are interesting also for the following reason: for achieving a different behaviour during different flight phases, the ratio of the rotation frequency to the forward velocity has a U-shaped function, i.e., its derivative crosses 0. Practically, it means that the boomerang being at the furthest point has a very low forward velocity. The kinetic energy of the forward component is then stored in the potential energy. This is not true for other types of boomerangs, where the loss of kinetic energy is non-reversible (the MTAs also store kinetic energy in potential energy during the first half of the flight, but then the potential energy is lost directly by the drag).

Related terms 
In Noongar language, kylie is a flat curved piece of wood similar in appearance to a boomerang that is thrown when hunting for birds and animals.
"Kylie" is one of the Aboriginal words for the hunting stick used in warfare and for hunting animals. Instead of following curved flight paths, kylies fly in straight lines from the throwers. They are typically much larger than boomerangs, and can travel very long distances; due to their size and hook shapes, they can cripple or kill an animal or human opponent. The word is perhaps an English corruption of a word meaning "boomerang" taken from one of the Western Desert languages, for example, the Warlpiri word "karli".

Cultural references 
Trademarks of Australian companies using the boomerang as a symbol, emblem or logo proliferate, usually removed from Aboriginal context and symbolising 'returning' or to distinguish an Australian brand. Early examples included Bain's White Ant Exterminator (1896); Webendorfer Bros. explosives (1898); E. A. Adams Foods (1920); and by the (still current) Boomerang Cigarette Papers Pty. Ltd.

"Aboriginalia", including the boomerang, as symbols of Australia dates from the late 1940s and early 1950s and was in widespread use by a largely European arts, crafts and design community. By the 1960s, the Australian tourism industry extended it to the very branding of Australia, particularly to overseas and domestic tourists as souvenirs and gifts and thus Aboriginal culture. At the very time when Aboriginal people and culture were subject to policies that removed them from their traditional lands and sought to assimilate them (physiologically and culturally) into mainstream white Australian culture, causing the Stolen Generations, Aboriginalia found an ironically "nostalgic", entry point into Australian popular culture at important social locations: holiday resorts and in Australian domestic interiors. In the 21st century, souvenir objects depicting Aboriginal peoples, symbolism and motifs including the boomerang, from the 1940s–1970s, regarded as kitsch and sold largely to tourists in the first instance, became highly sought after by both Aboriginal and non-Aboriginal collectors and has captured the imagination of Aboriginal artists and cultural commentators.

See also 
 Australian Aboriginal artefacts
 Batarang
 Bat'leth
 Captain Boomerang
 Chakram
 CAC Boomerang, a World War II fighter-plane
 Frisbee
 Googie, boomerang-shaped architecture
 Shuriken
 Throwing stick
 Valari

References

Further reading 
 Boomerang (Encyclopedia.com) 
 
 Nishiyama, Yutaka, Why do boomerangs come back?, Int. J. of Pure and Appl. Math. 78(3), 335–347, 2012. 
 Valde-Nowak et al. (1987). "Upper Palaeolithic boomerang made of a mammoth tusk in south Poland". Nature 329: 436–438 (1 October 1987); doi:10.1038/329436a0.

External links 

 International Federation of Boomerang Associations
  
 Boomerang aerodynamics: an online dissertation
 Explanation of the origin of the word 'Boomerang'  
 How to Throw a Boomerang

1790s neologisms
Australian Aboriginal bushcraft
Individual sports
Recreational weapons
Sports equipment
Throwing clubs
Australian inventions
Sports originating in Australia
Physical activity and dexterity toys
Australian English
Hunting equipment
National symbols of Australia
Primitive weapons
Weapons of Australia